Charles Henry Anderson (1838–1889) was a Scottish Liberal politician who served as Member of Parliament for Elginshire and Nairnshire from 1886 to 1889.

References 

1838 births
1889 deaths
Scottish Liberal Party MPs
Members of the Parliament of the United Kingdom for Scottish constituencies
UK MPs 1886–1892
People from Elgin, Moray
People from Nairn